Adam Woolnough (born 24 May 1982) is an Australian former professional rugby league footballer.

Background
Woolnough was born in Taree, New South Wales, Australia. He was educated at Taree High School and was 1999 Australian Schoolboys representative.

Playing career
Woolnough made his debut in 2002 for his junior club Newcastle Knights. This game was against New Zealand Warriors on 17 May coincidentally his mother's birth date. After six seasons (including one as captain) and 117 games, Woolnough made the decision to leave and head to the Penrith Panthers on a 3-year deal.

After two injury and form ravaged seasons, the 2009 NRL season was supposed to be his last. Woolnough announced his retirement on 19 August 2009, effective of his final 2009 NRL game, which was against his old club Newcastle Knights in Round 26, 2009.  However, after a year out travelling with his partner, Woolnough returned to the NRL in 2011. This was made possible by a chance meeting with former teammate, Clint Newton in the UK. Newton was playing for Hull Kingston Rovers, when the conversation turned to the Melbourne Storm. From this conversation, Woolnough spoke with Melbourne head coach Craig Bellamy, about the possibility of joining Melbourne for the 2011 NRL season. Woolnough later signed in July 2010 at a Paris hotel, but was encouraged to complete his trip before reporting to training in October 2010.

Newcastle Rugby League
In 2012, Woolnough played for Lakes United Newcastle Rugby League Team.

Post Rugby League career
Upon retirement, Woolnough worked in the underground coal mines near Newcastle. Woolnough was employed for over three years until a desire to return to the sporting industry come about. 

In 2015, Woolnough was employed at The Queensland Academy of Sport, working with their World and Olympic athlete in Personal Development (Career and Education, Welfare, Transitions, Community Engagements)

In 2022, Woolnough returned to rugby league, appointed by NRL Victoria as coach of the Victoria Thunderbolts Jersey Flegg Cup team.

Career highlights
 First Grade Debut: 2002 - Round 10, Newcastle vs New Zealand Warriors at EnergyAustralia Stadium, 17 May
 155 NRL games over 9 seasons with Newcastle Knights, Penrith Panthers, Melbourne Storm.
 Member of Prime Minister's XIII team to tour PNG in 2006.

Footnotes

1982 births
Living people
Australian rugby league players
Lakes United Seagulls players
Melbourne Storm players
Newcastle Knights captains
Newcastle Knights players
Penrith Panthers players
Prime Minister's XIII players
Rugby league players from Taree
Rugby league props
Western Suburbs Rosellas players
Windsor Wolves players